is an annual music show held among the Fuji Network System and Fuji Television since 1974. The program originated as a song contest to celebrate Fuji TV's 15th anniversary. It is commonly known as FNS, however it has no official short name.

Grand Prix Winners (1974–1990)

Best Singer Award

Best New Artist Award

Best Hit Song Award

Audience Award

Best Kayōkyoku Award

Special Award

Ceremonies

International guests (1992–present) 

a-ha
Sting
Judy Ongg
Jackie Chan
BoA
Jasmine Ann Allen
Destiny's Child
Park Yong-ha
Kenny Loggins
Ryu
Daniel Powter
Jero
TVXQ!
Big Bang
Alan Dawa Dolma
Salena Jones
K
Ben E. King
Che'Nelle
Marty Friedman
Chris Hart
SHINee
Iz*One
BTS
Seventeen
TOMORROW X TOGETHER
ENHYPEN
TWICE

References

Notes 
 音楽・芸能賞事典 Nichigai Associates 
 音楽・芸能賞事典 Nichigai Associates 1990/95

External links 
 Fuji Television
 Official FNS Music Festival webpage

1974 establishments in Japan
1974 Japanese television series debuts
Awards established in 1974
Fuji TV original programming
Japanese music awards
Japanese music television series